{{safesubst:#invoke:RfD|||month = March
|day = 18
|year = 2023
|time = 15:39
|timestamp = 20230318153935

|content=
REDIRECT Don't Look Up

}}